Nuffield College is one of the constituent colleges of the University of Oxford in England. It is a graduate college and specialises in the social sciences, particularly economics, politics and sociology. Nuffield is one of Oxford's newer colleges, having been founded in 1937, as well as one of the smallest, with around 90 postgraduate students and 60 academic fellows. It was also the first Oxford college to accept both men and women, having been coeducational since its foundation.

Its architecture is designed to conform to the traditional college layout and its modernist spire is a landmark for those approaching Oxford from the west.

As of 2021, the college had an estimated financial endowment of £282m. Due to its small intake, it was the wealthiest educational institution per student in the world as of 2013. Since 2017, Nuffield has committed to underwriting funding for all new students accepted to the college.

History 

Nuffield College was founded in 1937 after a donation to the University of Oxford by Lord Nuffield, the industrialist and founder of Morris Motors. On 16 November 1937, the University entered a Deed of Covenant and Trust with Lord Nuffield. He donated land for the college on New Road, to the west of the city centre near the mound of Oxford Castle, on the site of the largely disused basin of the Oxford Canal. As well as the land, Nuffield gave £900,000 to build the college and to provide it with an endowment. For the creation of Nuffield College and for his other donations he was described in 1949 by an editorial in The Times as "the greatest benefactor of the University since the Middle Ages".

From its inception, Nuffield College initiated a number of trends at both Oxford and Cambridge. It was the first college to have both women and men housed together. It was also the first college to consist solely of graduate students. In addition, it was the first in modern times to have a defined subject focus, namely the social sciences.

Nuffield appointed its first fellows in 1939, but the outbreak of World War II meant that the college's construction did not begin until 1949. During the War, Nuffield hosted the Nuffield College Social Reconstruction Survey, which examined issues related to post-War reconstruction. Nuffield admitted its first students in 1945, and received its Royal Charter from the hands of the Duke of Edinburgh on 6 June 1958.

Buildings

Nuffield is located on the site of the basin of the Oxford Canal to the west of Oxford. The land on which the college stands was formerly the city's principal canal basin and coal wharfs..

The architect Austen Harrison, who had worked in Greece and Palestine, was appointed by the University to design the buildings. His initial design, heavily influenced by Mediterranean architecture, was rejected by Nuffield, who called it "un-English" and refused to allow his name to be associated with it. Harrison reworked the plans, aiming for "something on the lines of Cotswold domestic architecture", as Nuffield wanted. The plans were approved by Lord Nuffield in 1940. Construction of the college began after the war in 1949. Restrictions on construction after the Second World War meant that work on the college was not completed until 1960. The original plan for the college to occupy land on both sides of Worcester Street was scaled down as a result of budget and material shortages, and to this day the land to the west of the college is occupied by a "temporary" car park. In one change, the tower, which had been planned to be ornamental, was redesigned to hold the college's library. The buildings are arranged around two quadrangles, with residential accommodation for students and fellows in one, and the hall, library and administrative offices in the other. The chapel has stained glass windows designed by John Piper.

The architectural aesthetic of the final design, particularly the tower and its flèche, has attracted some criticism; unlike the other "dreaming spires" of Oxford, Nuffield's tower is a masonry-clad steel-framed book-stack. The architectural historian Sir Howard Colvin said that Harrison's first design was Oxford's "most notable architectural casualty of the 1930s"; it has also been described as a "missed opportunity" to show that Oxford did not live "only in the past". Reaction to the architecture of the college has been largely unfavourable. In the 1960s, it was described as "Oxford's biggest monument to barren reaction". The tower has been described as "ungainly", and marred by repetitive windows. The travel writer Jan Morris wrote that the college was "a hodge-podge from the start". However, the architectural historian Sir Nikolaus Pevsner, although unimpressed with most of the college, thought that the tower helped the Oxford skyline and predicted it would "one day be loved". The writer Simon Jenkins doubted Pevsner's prediction, and claimed that "vegetation" was the "best hope" for the tower – as well as the rest of the college.

Research
Around a third of Nuffield's fellows hold appointments at the University of Oxford as lecturers, readers or professors. In addition, the college fully funds around a dozen "Official Fellowships", which the college views as tenured research professorships (although most also teach on the University's graduate programme), and about a dozen three-year Postdoctoral research fellows. The college also houses a number of young scholars who hold distinguished awards, such as British Academy post-doctoral fellowships, some senior research fellows and a group of research-active emeritus and honorary fellows. The college also produces works in the Nuffield Election Studies. The college is also home to the Centre for Social Investigation, an interdisciplinary research group examining inequalities and social progress in Britain.

The college was the birthplace of the "Oxford School" of Industrial Relations; it pioneered the development of cost-benefit analysis for developing countries; and it has made a major contribution to the methodology of econometrics.

Sport
Rowing at Nuffield is in association with the Linacre College Boat Club.

People associated with Nuffield

Notable students and fellows 

Many prominent people have studied at Nuffield, including Mark Carney, former Governor of the Bank of England, Manmohan Singh, former Prime Minister of India, Geoff Gallop, former Premier of Western Australia and Nicholas Stern, former Chief Economist of the World Bank and President of the British Academy.

Notable fellows have included psephologist David Butler, political philosopher Michael Oakeshott, political theorist and economist G. D. H. Cole, researcher of inequality Tony Atkinson, and statistician David Cox, who served as Warden between 1988 and 1994. Among the college's fellows and former fellows are three Nobel Prize laureates, John Hicks, James Mirrlees, and Amartya Sen.

Visiting fellows include Stephanie Flanders, former BBC economics editor, Tim Harford, author and economist, and George Soros, investor and philanthropist.

In 2008, a third of all economists who were fellows of the British Academy had connections to Nuffield, as did a quarter of all political science, sociology and social statistics fellows.

Wardens
Sir Harold Butler, 1938–1945
Sir Henry Clay, 1945–1949
Alexander Loveday, 1949–1954
Sir Norman Chester, 1954–1978
Michael Brock, 1978–1988
Sir David Cox, 1988–1994
Sir Anthony Atkinson, 1994–2006
Sir Stephen Nickell, 2006–2012
Sir Andrew Dilnot, 2012–present

Visitors 
The Visitor of Nuffield College is ex officio the Master of the Rolls, currently Sir Terence Etherton.

Gallery

References
Notes

References

Bibliography

External links 

 
 Virtual Tour of Nuffield College

 
Educational institutions established in 1937
Colleges of the University of Oxford
1937 establishments in England